Take Care of Amelie (French: Occupe-toi d'Amélie) is a 1932 French comedy film directed by Marguerite Viel and Richard Weisbach. It is based on the 1908 play Occupe-toi d'Amélie by Georges Feydeau, which was later adapted into the 1949 film Keep an Eye on Amelia.

Cast
 Renée Bartout as Amélie  
 Aimé Clariond 
 Raymond Dandy as Prince  
 Arthur Devère as Van Putzeboum  
 Caro Devère 
 René Donnio as Général  
 Vivian Grey 
 Robert Guillon 
 Yvonne Hébert as Irène  
 Georges Jamin 
 Fred Marche 
 Titys 
 Jean Weber as Marcel  
 Yvonne Yma

References

Bibliography 
 Goble, Alan. The Complete Index to Literary Sources in Film. Walter de Gruyter, 1999.

External links 
 

1932 comedy films
French comedy films
1932 films
1930s French-language films
Films based on works by Georges Feydeau
French films based on plays
Gaumont Film Company films
French black-and-white films
1930s French films